J.T. Smith may refer to:

 J. T. Smith (wrestler) (born 1967), American retired professional wrestler
 J. T. Smith (American football) (born 1955), former American football player
 J. T. Smith (musician) (fl. 1920s–1930s), American blues musician